Yan Lik Kin (born 13 July 1961) is a Hong Kong football coach.

He played for Seiko, South China, Sing Tao, Instant Dict, Golden/Sun Hei and Happy Valley. He qualified as an AFC Class A coach. He is the coach of Hong Kong team that participating 2009–10 Guangdong-Hong Kong Cup.

As he looked like singer Jacky Cheung when he was a player, he was also nicknamed "Jacky Cheung on the football pitch". Fans of Jacky Cheung mistook him for Cheung and sought his signature.

References

External links
 

1961 births
Living people
Hong Kong footballers
Hong Kong international footballers
Association football defenders
Hong Kong football managers
Seiko SA players
South China AA players
Sun Hei SC players
Footballers at the 1994 Asian Games
Asian Games competitors for Hong Kong